The 2000 Commonwealth of Independent States Cup was the eighth edition of the competition between the champions of former republics of Soviet Union. It was won by Spartak Moscow for the fifth time. For the second time in a row the competition was played in a two-division format introduced a year before.

Participants

 1 Dynamo Kyiv were represented mostly by Dynamo-2 and Dynamo-3 players, with a few additions from the main team.
 For the first time in competition history all 15 current champions of post-Soviet countries were represented, with no withdrawals or substitutions.

First Division

Group C
Unofficial table

Official table

 Turkmenistan promoted to the Top Division

Results

Group D

 Tajikistan promoted to the Top Division

Results

Top Division

Group A

Azerbaijan relegated to First Division

Results

Group B

Armenia relegated to First Division

Results

Final rounds

Semifinal
 Two results carried over from the First Round: Zimbru v Spartak 1–3 and BATE v Skonto 1–3

Results

Final

Top scorers

External links
2000 CIS Cup at rsssf.com
2000 CIS Cup at football.by
2000 CIS Cup at kick-off.by

2000
2000 in Russian football
1999–2000 in Ukrainian football
1999–2000 in European football
January 2000 sports events in Russia
2000 in Moscow